Sweeny is a surname which may refer to:

 Alastair Sweeny (born 1946), Canadian publisher, historian, and author
 Charles Sweeny (1882–1963), American soldier of fortune
 Charles Francis Sweeny (1910–1993), American businessman and socialite instrumental in forming the Second World War Eagle Squadrons, nephew of the soldier of fortune
 Craig Sweeny, American television producer and screenwriter
 Erin Sweeny, Australian psychologist
 George Sweeny (1796–1877), American politician
 Glynis Sweeny (born 1962), American illustrator and caricaturist
 Harry Sweeny (born 1998), Australian racing cyclist
 Hugh Sweeny, Australian prisoner of war during the Second World War
 James Sweeny (1857–1940), Canadian Anglican bishop
 John Sweeny (bishop) (1821–1901), Canadian Roman Catholic bishop
 John Sweeny (judge) (born 1949), American judge
 Mary Sweeny, 19th-century American vandal
 Matt Sweeny, Australian-American inventor and entrepreneur
 Peter B. Sweeny (1825–1911), American lawyer and politician
 Robert Sweeny Jr. (1911–1983), American amateur golfer and socialite, brother of Charles Francis Sweeny and nephew of Charles Sweeny
 Thomas William Sweeny (1820–1892), Irish-American Union Army general

See also
 Sweeney (name)